Zhichun Lu Station is an interchange station between Line 10 and Line 13 of the Beijing Subway.

Station Layout 
The line 10 station has an underground split island platform. The line 13 station has 2 at-grade side platforms.

Exits 
There are 5 exits, lettered A, B, F, G1, and G2. Exits A, B, G1, and G2 are accessible.

References

External links

Beijing Subway stations in Haidian District